The Spendthrift (German:Der Verschwender) is a 1917 Austrian silent historical film directed by Jacob Fleck and Luise Fleck and starring Marie Marchal, Wilhelm Klitsch and Hans Rhoden. It is an adaptation of Ferdinand Raimund's play of the same name.

Cast
 Marie Marchal as Cheristane  
 Wilhelm Klitsch as Flottwell  
 Hans Rhoden as Valentin  
 Liane Haid as Rosl  
 Karl Ehmann 
 Egon Brecher

References

Bibliography 
 Klossner, Michael. The Europe of 1500-1815 on Film and Television: A Worldwide Filmography of Over 2550 Works, 1895 Through 2000. McFarland, 2002.

External links 
 

1917 films
Austrian silent feature films
Austrian historical drama films
1910s historical drama films
Films set in the 19th century
Austrian films based on plays
Australian black-and-white films
1917 Austro-Hungarian films
1917 drama films
Silent historical drama films
1910s German-language films